Major-General John Reid Holden,  (1913–1995) was a British Army officer.

Military career
Holden was commissioned into the Royal Tank Corps in 1937. He saw action in the Middle East Campaign during the Second World War for which he was appointed a Companion of the Distinguished Service Order.

After the war he became Chief of British Mission to Soviet Forces in Europe in October 1961, Director of the Royal Armoured Corps in January 1965 and General Officer Commanding 43rd (Wessex) Division/District in February 1963 before retiring in December 1964.

He was appointed a Commander of the Order of the British Empire in the 1961 New Year Honours and a Companion of the Order of the Bath in the 1965 Birthday Honours.

References

1913 births
1995 deaths
British Army major generals
Companions of the Order of the Bath
Commanders of the Order of the British Empire
Companions of the Distinguished Service Order
Royal Tank Regiment officers
British Army personnel of World War II
Graduates of the Royal Military College, Sandhurst
British military attachés